Vice-Admiral Samuel Greig, or Samuil Karlovich Greig, as he was known in Russia (30 November 1735, Inverkeithing, Fife, Scotland – 26 October 1788, Tallinn, Estonia, Russian Empire) was a Scottish-born Russian admiral who distinguished himself in the Battle of Chesma (1770) and the Battle of Hogland (1788). His son Alexey Greig also made a spectacular career in the Imperial Russian Navy.

Early life

He was born on 30 November 1735 in the burgh of Inverkeithing in Fife. Initially he was a seaman who worked on his father's ships before entering the Royal Navy before 1758 as a Master's mate. He was present at naval engagements at the Capture of Gorée (1758), the Battle of Quiberon Bay (1759) and the Battle of Havana (1762).  He was promoted to acting lieutenant in 1761 but the Royal Navy took several years to confirm this rank.

The court of Russia having requested the government of Great Britain to send out some British naval officers of skill to improve the marine of that country, Lieutenant Greig had the honour of being selected as one. His superior abilities there also soon attracted the notice of the Russian government, and he was speedily promoted to the rank of captain.

Family
Samuel Greig married Sarah (1752–1793), daughter of Alexander Cook. Their union would give rise to children and grandchildren who later married into the Russian and German nobility.

He was father to Alexey Greig, admiral of the Imperial Russian Navy, who would go on to have his own spectacular career in the Russian Navy. Alexey Greig would become a privy counsellor and knight of all the Imperial Russian Orders.

Greig was father-in-law to Scottish science writer and polymath, Mary Somerville who was a distant cousin of his. Somerville had married Greig's fourth son, Captain Samuil Samuilovich Greig (1778–1807), who was the Russian Consul in London. They had two sons before Greig died in 1807, one of whom, Woronzow Greig (1805–1865) became a barrister and scientist.

Another son, Ivan Samuilovich Greig (1776–1802), traveled to China but was never heard of again.

His grandson Samuil Alexeyvich Greig (1827–1887) was the Russian Minister of Finance 1877–80. A general-lieutenant, he took part in the defence of Sebastopol during the Crimea War. He is buried in Smolenskoe Lutheran Cemetery in St. Petersburg.

The Battle of Chesma

When some time after the war broke out between the Russians and the Turks, Captain Greig was sent in 1770 under the command of Count Alexey Orlov and Admiral Grigory Spiridov, with a fleet to the Mediterranean. The Turkish fleet of around 15 ships of the line plus frigates and galleys which they met near Chesma Bay, western Turkey, was much superior to the Russian force of 9 ships of the line and 3 frigates. After a severe and sanguinary but indecisive battle, the Turkish fleet retired during the night close into Chesma Bay, where they were protected by batteries on land. Notwithstanding the formidable position which the enemy had taken up, the Russian admiral determined to pursue, and if possible destroy these by means of his fire-ships.

At one o’clock in the morning Captain Greig bore down upon the enemy with his fire-ships, and succeeded in totally destroying the Turkish fleet. Captain Greig, on this occasion assisted by another British officer, a Lieutenant Drysdale, who acted under him, set the match to the fire ships with his own hands. This perilous duty performed, he and Drysdale leaped overboard and swam to their own boats, under a tremendous fire from the Turks, and at the imminent hazard besides of being destroyed by the explosion of their own fire-ships. Following up this success, the Russian fleet now attacked the town and batteries on shore, and by nine o’clock in the morning there was scarcely a vestige remaining of the town, fortifications, or fleet. For this important service, Captain Greig, who had been appointed commodore on his being placed in command of the fire-ships, was immediately promoted by Count Orlov to the rank of admiral, an appointment which was confirmed by an express from the Empress of Russia.

A peace was soon afterwards concluded between the two powers, but this circumstance did not lessen the importance of Admiral Greig's services to the government by which he was employed. He continued indefatigable in his exertions in improving the Russian fleet, remodeling its code of discipline, and by his example infusing a spirit into every department of its economy, which finally made it one of the most formidable marines in Europe. These important services were fully appreciated by the empress, who rewarded them by promoting Greig to the high rank of admiral of the Russian Empire, and governor of Kronstadt. In 1782 he was elected a Fellow of the Royal Society

The Battle of Hogland

Admiral Greig next distinguished himself against the Swedes, whose fleet he blocked up in port, whilst he himself rode triumphantly in the open seas of the Baltic. Several days after winning the Battle of Hogland, he was attacked by a violent fever, and having been carried to Reval, died on 26 October 1788, on board of his own ship, Rostislav, after a few days' illness, in the 53rd year of his life. As soon as the empress heard of his illness, she, in the utmost anxiety about a life so valuable to herself and her empire, instantly sent for her first physician, Dr Rogerson, and ordered him to proceed immediately to Revel and to do every thing in his power for the admiral's recovery. Dr Rogerson obeyed, but all his skill was unavailing.

The ceremonial of the admiral's funeral in the Tallinn Cathedral was conducted with the utmost pomp and magnificence. For some days before it took place the body was exposed in state in the hall of the admiralty, and was afterwards conveyed to the grave on a splendid funeral bier drawn by six horses, covered with black cloth, and attended in public procession by an immense concourse of nobility, clergy, and naval and military officers of all ranks; the whole escorted by large bodies of troops, in different divisions; with tolling of bells and firing of cannon from the ramparts and fleet: every thing in short was calculated to express the sorrow of an empire for the loss of one of its most useful men. Catherine, the Empress of Russia, had her architect Giacomo Quarenghi design Greig's tomb.

Honours
In 1864, Greigia is a genus of the botanical family Bromeliaceae is named after him, by Eduard August von Regel (a director of the St Petersburg Botanical Garden).
Then in 1873, Regel named a species of Tulip after him, Tulipa greigii. Due to Greig once being president of the Russian Horticultural Society.

Family
His eldest son Samuel Greig married Mary Fairfax daughter of Sir William George Fairfax who later married Dr William Somerville and became famous in her own right as Mary Somerville.

References

 This article incorporates text from Biographical Dictionary of Eminent Scotsmen originally edited by Robert Chambers and published by Blackie and Son of Glasgow, Edinburgh, and London in 1856. This work is in the public domain.

1735 births
1788 deaths
People from Inverkeithing
Imperial Russian Navy admirals
Scottish admirals
Royal Navy officers
Burials at St Mary's Cathedral, Tallinn
Recipients of the Order of St. George of the Second Degree
Fellows of the Royal Society
Russian military personnel of the Russo-Swedish War (1788–1790)
18th-century Scottish people
18th-century Royal Navy personnel
18th-century military personnel from the Russian Empire